The Lulworth Formation is a geologic formation in England. It dates from the late Tithonian to the mid Berriasian. It is a subunit of the Purbeck Group. In Dorset, it consists of three members, which are in ascending order, the Mupe Member, the Ridgway Member, and the Warbarrow Tout Member. The Mupe Member is typically 11 to 16 m thick and largely consists of marls and micrites with interbeds of calcareous mudstone. The Ridgeway Member is about 3 to 7 m thick and consists of in its western portion carbonaceous muds, marls and micrites, in the east the muds are replaced by micritic limestone. The Warbarrow Tout Member is 17 to 39 m thick and consists of limestone at the base and micrite and mudstone for the rest of the sequence,  this member is the primary source of the vertebrate fossils within the formation. Elsewhere the unit is undifferentiated.

Vertebrate paleobiota

Amphibians

Turtles

Lepidosaurs

Crocodyliformes

Dinosaurs

Mammals

See also 
 List of fossiliferous stratigraphic units in England
 List of dinosaur bearing rock formations

References 

Geologic formations of the United Kingdom
Fossiliferous stratigraphic units of the United Kingdom
Jurassic England
Cretaceous England
Tithonian Stage
Berriasian Stage
Limestone formations
Fluvial deposits
Lacustrine deposits
Lower Cretaceous Series of Europe